Muhilankudieruppu is a village located in Agasteeswaram Taluk, Kanyakumari District, Tamil Nadu, India.  Located 4 km from Kanyakumari and 16 km from Nagercoil (capital town of Kanyakumari on the road connecting Kanyakumari with Nagercoil and nearest city Trivandrum (Kerala). The village is surrounded by paddy fields, coconut groves, element enriched and beautiful sea shore (Indian Ocean).  Further, this village has a pleasant climate throughout the year and benefited by both north east and south west monsoons.  Muhilai is divided into two parts, West Muhilai (mela) and East Muhilai (keezha).  Keezha muhilai people worship Hindu Goddess Devi Mutharamman and mela muhilai people worship the Swamy Sriman Ayya Narayanaswamy.  Nearly two thousand people live here and most of the people are well-educated; some work as doctors, engineers, scientists all over the world. Muhilankudieruppu has an average literacy rate of 94%, far higher than the national average of 59.5%: male literacy is 97%, and female literacy is 91%. The Holy place of Swamythoppu pathy (Ayyavazhi) is located near Muhilankudierrupu, 4 km away.

Agriculture
Major crops under cultivations: Rice, Coconut, Banana, Mango, Tamarind  and Cashew

Schools
 Government High School, Elanthaiyadivilai
 Government Kindergarten (Pallar Palli)

Industries
Coir Industries

Major festivals
 Chithirai Thiruvizha (10 days) - Devi Mutharamman temple (Every year month of May)
 Karthigai Thiruvizha (16 days) - Ayya Sriman Narayanaswamy temple (Month of November)
 Sudalaimada Swamy Kodaivizha - Throughout the year
 Pongal Celebration (3–4 days)  - Sports and cultural activities

External links
 Muhilankudieruppu

Villages in Kanyakumari district